Janko Prunk (born 30 December 1942) is a Slovenian historian of modern history. He has published articles and monographs on analytical politology, modern history, the genesis of modern political formations, and the history of social and political philosophy in Slovenia. He has also written on the history of political movements in Europe from the end of the 18th century until today, especially about Slovene Christian socialism and the history of Slovenian national questions.

Biography 
Prunk was born in the small settlement of Loka pri Zidanem Mostu (part of the municipality of Sevnica), in central Slovenia, which was then the German-occupied Slovenian Styria.

Prunk started going to primary school in his birthplace. After fourth grade, he shifted to the school in nearby Radeče. He continued his secondary education at Gymnasium in Celje. Graduating from history and sociology at the University of Ljubljana in 1966. He was recruited into Yugoslav People's Army in Sisak, Socialist Republic of Croatia in the years 1966/67. He obtained his master's degree from University of Ljubljana in 1972. In 1976, he obtained his PhD with a thesis on Slovenian Christian Socialist movement 1918-1941, which was still a controversial topic at that time. Prunk was awarded scholarships by the Alexander von Humboldt Foundation. He worked as a researcher and visiting professor at the University of Freiburg in 1984/1985 and 1994/1995, and in 1988/1989 at the University of Cologne.

From 1966 to 1995, he worked at the Institute for modern history in Ljubljana. Until his retirement in 2013 he worked as professor at the Faculty of Social Sciences of the University of Ljubljana.

Prunk is a member of Leibniz Institute of European History in Mainz, and a senior member of the Center for European Integration Studies in Bonn.

Politics 
Prunk has been actively involved in politics. As an early admirer of Jože Pučnik, Prunk joined the Democratic Opposition of Slovenia after the democratization of Slovenia. He was an active member of the Slovenian Democratic Party (known as Slovenian Social Democratic Party between 1989 and 2003). Between 1992 and 1993, Prunk served as Minister for Slovenes outside Slovenia and National Minorities in Slovenia in the first coalition cabinet of Janez Drnovšek.

After 1994, Prunk withdrew from politics for over a decade. Before the parliamentary elections of 2004, he campaigned for the Slovenian Democratic Party. In 2005, he was appointed by the Foreign Minister Dimitrij Rupel, as president of the Slovene-Croatian Historical Commission, formed by the Government of the two countries, to shed light on the history of the relations between them. Between 2004 and 2008, he served as chairman of the Slovenian Democratic Party's internal Committee for Education Policies. He resigned in 2008 because of disagreements over the Government's policy favoring private universities. After the split with the party, he became very critical of the then Prime Minister Janez Janša, whom he accused of being a "liberal with an authoritative touch, who aspires at becoming a Slovenian Piłsudski".

After the parliamentary elections of 2008, Prunk explained his disappointment with the Slovenian Democratic Party as a consequence of its neo-liberal turn. In Prunk's opinion, the party turned its back to the ideals of welfare state held by its founding father Jože Pučnik. Prunk also criticised the charismatic type of leadership of the party's president Janez Janša, stating that the party would most probably collapse if Janša resigned.

Honors and awards 
 1999: Ambassador of the Republic of Slovenia in science award.
 2016: Sigmund Zois award for superior achievement, for scientific monography Zgodovina Evrope v dobi racionalistične civilizacije 1775-2015 (History of Europe in the era of rationalist civilisation 1775-2015).

Selected publications 
Prunk has written over 500 specialized articles and books, since 1966. His book, A brief history of Slovenia: Historical background of the Republic of Slovenia is one of the most comprehensive works on modern Slovenian history.

Bibliography

See also 
 History of Slovenia

References

External links 

University of Ljubljana alumni
Academic staff of the University of Ljubljana
Academic staff of the University of Cologne
Academic staff of the University of Freiburg
Historians of Europe
Historians of the Balkans
20th-century Slovenian historians
Slovenian journalists
20th-century Slovenian philosophers
Slovenian sociologists
Slovenian Democratic Party politicians
Slovenian expatriates in Germany
People from the Municipality of Sevnica
1942 births
Living people
Slovenian anti-communists
21st-century Slovenian historians
Slovenian translators
21st-century Slovenian philosophers